Islamic fundamentalism in Iran is the practice of Islamic fundamentalism in the nation of Iran. The three types of Islam in Iran are traditionalism, modernism, and a variety of forms of revivalism usually termed fundamentalism. Neo-fundamentalists in Iran are a subgroup of fundamentalists who have borrowed from Western themes of populism, fascism, anarchism, Jacobinism, and Marxism. The term "Principlists" or Osoulgarayan, is an umbrella for a variety of conservative circles and parties. The term contrasts with reformists or Eslaah-Talabaan, who seek religious and constitutional reforms.

Definition

"Fundamentalism is the belief in absolute religious authority and the demand that this religious authority be legally enforced. Often, fundamentalism involves the willingness to do battle for one's faith. Fundamentalists make up only one part of any religion's followers, who usually fall along a wide spectrum of different interpretations, beliefs and strong values."

Differences between Christian fundamentalism and Islamic fundamentalism include (according to Bernard Lewis):

The Islamist version of political Islam ("neo-fundamentalism" in this article) emerged in response to the perceived shortcomings of fundamentalism. Islamists with cosmopolitan backgrounds introduced various tools they had borrowed from the West into their organizational techniques. Ideologically, they drew on antimodernist philosophies that embodied Western dissatisfaction with the consequences of industrialization and positivism.

Iranian fundamentalists and conservatives commonly describe themselves as "principalist" (also spelled principlist); that is, acting politically based on Islamic and revolutionary principles.

Background 
The three main types of Islam extremism are: traditionalists (represented by Hossein Nasr, Yousef Sanei), modernists (represented by Abdolkarim Soroush), and fundamentalists (represented by Ali Khamenei, Mohammad Taghi Mesbah-Yazdi, and several Grand Ayatollahs including Mahdi Hadavi). The terms "conservatism," "fundamentalism" and "neo-fundamentalism" are all subject to philosophical debates. Javad Tabatabaei, Ronald Dworkin and a few other philosophers of law and politics criticized the terminology and suggested various other classifications in the context of Iranian political philosophy. According to Bernard Lewis:

Some researchers categorized Iranian thinkers in five classes:
 Anti-religious intellectuals
 Religious intellectuals
 Traditionists
 Traditionalists
 Fundamentalists

Traditionists (the majority of clerics) avoid modernity and neither accept nor criticize it. Traditionalists believe in eternal wisdom and are critics of humanism and modernity. Traditionalists believe in religious pluralism, which separates them from Fundamentalists. Fundamentalists are also against modernity. Contrary to traditionists, fundamentalists openly criticize modernity. Moreover, fundamentalists believe that for reviving the religion in the modern era and for opposing modernity, they need to gain social and political power. This makes fundamentalists different from traditionists and traditionalists who are not interested in political power.

Ruhollah Khomeini is considered to be a populist, fundamentalist and reformer by various observers. In July 2007 Iranian reformist president Mohammad Khatami said that Ruhollah Khomeini was the leading "reformist" of our time.

Emergence
Fundamentalism in Iran began in the early 20th century, almost a century after secular humanism and its associated art and science arrived. Sheikh Fazlollah Nouri and Navvab Safavi were among the pioneers of religious fundamentalismsniper and serve as the Iran's foremost role models.

Iran was the first country in the post-World War II era in which political Islam became the rallying cry for a revolution, which was followed by formally adopting political Islam as its ruling ideology. The grand alliance that led to the 1979 revolution abandoned traditional clerical quietism, adopting diverse ideological interpretations of Islam. The first three Islamic discourses were Khomeinism, Ali Shariati's Islamic-left ideology, and Mehdi Bazargan's liberal-democratic Islam. The fourth discourse came from the socialist guerrilla groups of Islamic and secular variants, and the fifth was secular constitutionalism in socialist and nationalist forms.

Hassan Rahimpour Azghandi offers the following apologia for the emergence of Islamic fundamentalism:
"It should be made clear that if fundamentalism or terrorism exist, they are a reaction to the colonial militarism of the West in the Islamic world, from the 18th century until today. European armies occupied all of North and South America and Africa, in the 17th, 18th, and 19th centuries, and divided them among themselves. Then they came to the Islamic world in North Africa, Asia, and the Middle East. It is only natural that the Muslims act in accordance with their religious duty, just as you would defend your homes if they were occupied. Why do we call resistance 'terrorism'? When Hitler and the Fascists rolled Europe in blood and dust–would your forefathers be called terrorists if they conducted resistance?"

Islamism thus emerged as a competing narrative contending for state power against a secularist discourse. Its totalizing goal was to seize state power and Islamize all aspects of life.

In May 2005, Ali Khamenei defined the reformist principle-ism (Osoulgaraiee eslah-talabaaneh) of his Islamic state in opposition to the perceived hostility of the West:
"While adhering to and preserving our basic principles, we should try to constantly rectify and improve our methods. This is the meaning of real reformism. But U.S. officials define reformism as opposition to Islam and the Islamic system."

In January 2007, a new parliamentary faction announced its formation. The former Osulgarayan ("principalist") faction split due to "lack of consensus" on Mahmoud Ahmadinejad's policies. The new faction was named "Faction of creative principalists" which is critical of Ahmadinejad's neo-principalist policies and to reject conservatism on matters related to government. The main leaders of the faction are Emad Afroogh, Mohammad Khoshchehreh, Saeed Aboutaleb and MP Sobhani.

Viewpoints

Iranian fundamentalism must be seen as one of the Abrahamic revivalisms of the twentieth century. As in the course of the Persian Constitutional Revolution nearly a century earlier, the concept of justice was at the center of the debates among the followers of the three Islamic orientations. The principalists adhered to the traditional notion of Islamic justice that states "equals should be treated alike, but unequal proportionately to their relevant differences, and all with impartiality". Neo-principalists gave a messianic interpretation to the concept, one that promised equal distribution of societal resources to all—including the "unequals." And finally, those with a liberal orientation related the notion of justice to the French revolutionary slogan of egalité, i.e., the equality of all before the law.

While the principalists were generally suspicious of modern ideas and resistant to modern lifestyles at the time of the revolution, the neo-principalists were receptive to many aspects of modernity and willing to collaborate with secular intellectuals and political activists.

Many of the neo-principalists, like Christian fundamentalists, extract a verse from the scriptures and give it a meaning contrary to traditional commentary. While denouncing modernism as the "Great Satan", many principalists accept its foundations, especially relating to science and technology. For traditionalists, nature expresses beauty that must be preserved in every aspect of life, from chanting the Qur'an to an artisan's fashioning an everyday pot. Many principalists even seek a Qur'anic basis for modern man's dominion over and destruction of nature by referring to the injunction to 'dominate the earth'–misconstruing the idea of viceregency: that man is expected to be the perfect servant of God.An example of an environmental problem is overpopulation. The neo-principalists' family policy is to increase the population dramatically. Ahmadinejad's call for increasing Iran's population from 70 to 120 million can be understood in that context.

In Mehdi Mozaffan's chapter on comparative study of Islamism in Algeria and Iran, he says,
"I define Islamic fundamentalism or Islamism as a militant and anti-modernist movement ... not every militant Muslim is a fundamentalist. but an Islamic fundamentalist is necessarily a militant."

A major difference between Shia fundamentalism in Iran and mainstream Islamic fundamentalism is that the former has nothing to do with Salafism. According to Gary Legenhausen: "The term Islamic Fundamentalism is one that has been invented by Western journalists by analogy with Christian Fundamentalism. It is not a very apt term, but it has gained currency. In the Sunni world, it is used for groups descended from the Salafiyyah movement, such as the Muslim Brotherhood." The concept of  "Salaf" (السلف) does not exist in Shia theology, in contrast to Sunni Islam as well as Christianity (referred to as "original Christianity").

Political Islam consists of an array of movements in the Muslim world that hold that political power is an essential instrument for constructing a God-fearing society. They believe that Muslims can fulfill their religious obligations only when public law sanctions and encourages pious behavior. To this end, the majority of these movements work to take control of state power, whether by propaganda, plebiscite, or putsch.

Various clerics express significant differences in viewpoints and practical approaches. When Khomeini urged his mentor Ayatullah Husain Borujerdi to oppose the Shah more openly. Broujerdi rejected that idea. He believed in the separation of religion from politics, and was Khomeini's senior in rank. Just before his death (1961) Boroujerdi expressed his opposition to the Shah's plans for land reform and women's enfranchisement. He issued a fatwa for killing Ahmad Kasravi. Khomeini remained silent while his seniors Ayatollah Haeri and Ayatolla Boroujerdi were alive. Thereafter he was promoted to a Grand Marja, started his activism, and worked to establish the Islamic Republic. Among Khomeini's students were notable clerics whose ideas were not compatible with their mentor, for example Morteza Motahhari, Mohammad Beheshti, and Mohammad Taghi Mesbah-Yazdi. Criticizing Mesbah-Yazdi and Haghani school, Beheshti said: "Controversial and provocative positions that are coupled with violence, in my opinion...will have the reverse effect. Such positions remind many individuals of the wielding of threats of ex-communication that you have read about in history concerning the age of the Inquisition, the ideas of the Church, and the Middle Ages". Motahhari, Khomeini's most notable student, was known as one of the revolution's main theoreticians (next to Ali Shariati). While Mesbah-Yazdi was an advocate of expelling secular University lecturers, Motahhari insisted that the philosophies of marxism and liberalism must be taught by a Marxist and a liberal, respectively. Both Motahhari and Beheshti were assassinated by terrorist groups shortly after the revolution. Motahhari introduced the concept of the "dynamism of Islam".

After the revolution and the subsequent liquidation of the and secular-leftist groups, two principal ideological camps became dominant in Iranian politics: the fundamentalists and the radicals. The radicals followed the Khomeini of the revolution rather than his incumbency or his theocratic vision of Islamic Government: (government of the jurist). Mesbah-Yazdi rejected Khomeini's Islamic Republic and supported the idea of an Islamic government in which the people have no vote.

Contrary to Iranian traditionalists, neo-fundamentalists as well as Iranian liberals came under the influence of Western thinkers. Islamic neo-fundamentalists borrowed from Western countercurrents of populism, fascism, anarchism, Jacobinism, and Marxism without the welfare state. During the 1990s, Akbar Ganji discovered links that connected the chain murders of Iran to the reigning neoconservative clergymen (Ali Fallahian, Gholam Hossein Mohseni-Ejehei, and Mesbah-Yazdi) who had issued the fatwas legitimizing assassinations of secular humanists and religious modernists. In May 1996, Ganji presented a lecture at Shiraz University entitled "Satan Was the First Fascist." He was charged with defaming the Islamic Republic and tried in a closed court. His defense was later published under the title of "Fascism is one of the Mortal Sins". (Kian, Number 40, February 1997.)

Another important issue is the concept of "insider-outsider" introduced by Khamenei, later the supreme leader. In his administration outsiders have fewer rights compared to insiders and cannot assume administrative posts. He stated that "I mean, you [to his followers] must trust an insider as a member of your clique. We must consider as insiders those persons who are sympathetic toward our revolution, our state, and Islam. The outsiders are the ones who are opposed to the principle of our state."

In another speech Khamenei compared what he called "American fundamentalism" and "Islamic fundamentalism":
"We can see that in the world today there are nations with constitutions going back 200 to 300 years. The governments of these nations, which occasionally protest against the Islamic Republic, firmly safeguard their own constitutions. They clutch firmly to safeguard centuries-old constitutions to protect them frocem harm. [...] However, when it comes to us and as we show commitment to our constitution and values, they accuse us of fundamentalism or describe us as reactionaries. In other words, the American fundameentalism is viewed as a positive virtue, whereas Islamic fundamentalism–based on logic, wisdom, experience and desire for independence–is condemned as some sort of debasement. Of course, they no longer use that term fundamentalism to describe us, instead they refer to us as conservatives."

He distinguished what he called "extremism" and "fundamentalism": "There may be a handful of extremists here and there, but all the elements serving in various departments of our country are fundamentalists in essence."

Iranian neoconservatives reject democracy, the Universal Declaration of Human Rights (UDHR)and disparage those who disagree. In particular Mesbah-Yazdi is an aggressive defender of the supreme leader's absolute power, and holds that democracy and elections are not compatible with Islam. He once stated:
"Democracy means if the people want something that is against God's will, then they should forget about God and religion ... Be careful not to be deceived. Accepting Islam is not compatible with democracy."

In contrast to neo-principalists, principalists accept the ideas of democracy and UDHR. During his lifetime, Khomeini expressed support for UDHR; in Sahifeh Nour (Vol.2 Page 242), he states: "We would like to act according to the Universal Declaration of Human Rights. We would like to be free. We would like independence." However, Iran adopted an "alternative" human rights declaration, the Cairo Declaration on Human Rights in Islam, in 1990 (one year after Khomeini's death).

Multiple thinkers consider the practice of Islamic criminal punishment such as stoning. Ayatollah Gholamreza Rezvani states that the Q'uran sanctions stoning unequivocally and that since it is the word of God, it must be followed as if Rezvani was tasked by God to carry forward this message. This is in contrast to the principalist view. In December 2002, Hashemi Shahroudi, the principalist Head of Judiciary ordered a ban on stoning.

During Mohammad Khatami's presidency, Mesbah-Yazdi claimed that an unnamed former CIA chief had visited Iran with a suitcase stuffed with dollars to pay opinion-formers. He stated, "What is dangerous is that agents of the enemy, the CIA, have infiltrated the government and the cultural services." On top of its official budget for Iran, the CIA had given "hundreds of millions of dollars to our cultural officials and journalists," he added, continuing "He made contact with various newspaper chiefs and gave them dollars." Nasser Pourpirar claimed that a significant portion of recorded Iranian history was baseless fabrications by Jewish orientalists and Zionists. "The whole existence of Pre-Islamic Iran is no more than a Jewish conspiracy and the most important key for analyzing today's world events is the analysis of the ancient "Jewish genocide of Purim." Another neoconservative theorist, Mohammad Ali Ramin, believes that contemporary western history (e.g. Holocaust) is all Jewish fabrications. He even claimed that Adolf Hitler was a Jew. M.A. Ramin, Hassan Abbasi, Abbas Salimi Namin and others gave speeches about Jewish conspiracy theory, Iranian and western history following the establishment of Ahmadinejad's government in 2005. Abadgaran described itself as a group of Islamic neo-principalists, that has control over the Iranian government. However, it lost the 2006 city council election.

Abdolkarim Soroush stated that if a people's religious identity becomes more salient than its national identity, fundamentalism rises. In other words, fundamentalism can be seen as "identity-ism." Many of the religious remarks that are made in Iran, especially from official platforms, rest the inculcation of religious identity.

Some among Iran's leadership would accept accommodation with the West in exchange for economic and strategic concessions, while others accept isolation. Others favor a "Chinese model," which in Iran would open its economy to international investment while maintaining clerical dominance.

Circles, schools and organizations

Fadayan-e Islam

Fadayan-e Islam was founded in 1946 as an Islamic fundamentalist organization. Navab Safavi, a neo-fundamentalist cleric, founded the group. The group's aim was to transform Iran into an Islamic state. The group committed numerous terrorist acts. Notable among these was the 1946 assassination of Ahmad Kasravi, an intellectual who had criticized the Shia Islamic clergy. The group also assassinated two prime ministers (Ali Razmara and Hassan Ali Mansour, 1951 and 1965) and a former prime minister, Abdolhossein Hazhir, in 1949.

Haghani school
Haghani Circle is a neo-fundamentalist school of thought in Iran founded by a group of clerics based in the holy city of Qom and headed by Ayatollah Mohammad Taghi Mesbah-Yazdi, an influential cleric and theologian.

The school trains clerics with both a traditional and modern curriculum, including secular science, medicine, politics, and Western/non-Islamic philosophy (topics not taught in traditional schools). It was founded by Mesbah-Yazdi, Ayatollah Ahmad Jannati, Beheshti and Ayatollah Sadoughi.

Many famous theologians and influential figures in Iran's politics after the revolution were associated (as teacher or student) with the Circle or follow its ideology.

Combatant Clergy Association

The association is composed of conservative elements of Iran's political culture, including the nation's foremost politicized clerics, the Friday prayer leaders in most of Iran's metropolitan areas, the bazaar merchants, and the Supreme Leader. Not surprisingly, members of this faction support the status quo, including strict limits on personal freedoms and the continued primacy of the clergy in the nation's governance. Important constituents of the Militant Clergy Society include the Islamic Coalition Society and the Coalition of Followers of the Line of the Imam.

The Combatant Clergy Association was the majority party in the 4th and 5th parliaments after the Iranian revolution. It was founded in 1977 by a group of clerics who intended to use a cultural approach to overthrow the Shah. Its founding members were Khamenei, Motahhari, Beheshti, Bahonar, Rafsanjani and Mohammad Mofatteh and its current members include Rafsanjani, Ahmad Jannati, Mahdavi Kani, Reza Akrami and Hassan Rohani.

As the foremost advocates of the status quo, the Association is not popular among rank-and-file Iranians.

Ansar e Hezbollah
Ansar-e-Hezbollah is a militant neo-fundamentalist group. Mojtaba Bigdeli is a spokesman for the Iranian Hezbollah. Human Rights Watch (HRW) condemned the assault on students at Tehran University halls of residence in the early hours of Friday 9 July 1999 by group members.

Basij
Basij is a military fundamentalist network. In July 1999, Ezzat Ebrahim-Nejad was shot dead in a Tehran University dormitory by a member of Basij's military force. The event initiated a demonstration. In 2001, a member of the Basij, Saeed Asgar attempted to assassinate Saeed Hajjarian, a political advisor to Khatami. Asagar was arrested and sentenced to 15 years in prison, but was released after a short interval. HRW stated that the Basij belong to the "Parallel institutions" (nahad-e movazi), "the quasi-official organs of repression that have become increasingly open in crushing student protests, detaining activists, writers, and journalists in secret prisons, and threatening pro-democracy speakers and audiences at public events." Under the control of the Office of the Supreme Leader these groups operate arbitrary checkpoints around Tehran, while uniformed police refrain from confronting them. "Illegal prisons, which are outside of the oversight of the National Prisons Office, are sites where political prisoners are abused, intimidated, and tortured with impunity." On 8 March 2004 the Basij initiated a violent crackdown on activists celebrating International Women's Day in Tehran. On 13 November 2006 Tohid Ghaffarzadeh, a student at Islamic Azad University of Sabzevar, was murdered by a Basij member at the university. The murderer reportedly said that what he did was according to his religious beliefs. Tohid Ghaffarzadeh was talking to his girlfriend when he was approached and knifed by the Basij member.

Theories of state based on divine legitimacy
Various theories of state based on divine legitimacy were proposed by Iranian clerics. Four types of theocracies can be distinguished. Iin chronological order:

 "Appointed Mandate of Jurisconsult" in Religious Matters (Shar'iat) Along with the Monarchic Mandate of Muslim Potentates in Secular Matters (Saltanat E Mashrou'eh). Proponents: Mohammad Bagher Majlesi (Allameh Majlesi), Mirza ye Ghomi, Seyed e Kashfi, Sheikh Fadl ollah Nouri, Ayatollah Abdolkarim Haeri Mesbah-Yazdi.
 "General Appointed Mandate of Jurisconsults" (Velayat E Entesabi Ye Ammeh) Proponents: Molla Ahmad Naraghi, Sheikh Mohammad Hassan Najafi (Saheb Javaher) Ayatollahs Husain Borujerdi, Golpayegani, Khomeini, (before the revolution) 
"General Appointed Mandate of the Council of the Sources of Imitation" (Velayat E Entesabi Ye Ammeh Ye Shora Ye Marje'eh Taghlid) Proponents: Ayatollahs: Abdollah Javadi-Amoli, Beheshti, Taheri Khorram Abadi
 "Absolute Appointed Mandate of Jurisconsult" (Velayat e Entesabi ye Motlaghe ye Faghihan) Proponent: Khomeini (after revolution)

Islamic republic versus Islamic administration
Since Khatami's election in 1997, two outlooks toward the achievement of reform in Iran have predominated: "Reformists" within the regime (in-system reformers) claim that the Constitution has the capacity to lead the "Revolutionary" government of Iran toward "democracy." By contrast, secularists, who remain outside the regime, claim that the Constitution contains impediments sufficient to block meaningful reform.

Fundamentalists and in-system reformers on one side and neo-fundamentalists on the other side struggle over "Khomeini's Islamic Republic" versus "Mesbah's Islamic administration." Mesbah-Yazdi and Ansar-e-Hezbollah call for a change in the Iranian constitution from a republic to an Islamic administration. They believe the institutions of the Islamic Republic, such as the Majlis (Iran's Parliament), are contradictory to Islamic government which is centered around Velayat-e Faqih and total obedience.

Khamenei has remained silent on the issue. However, he clearly rejected the supervision of Assembly of Experts over the institutions under his responsibility (e.g. Military forces, Judiciary system and IRIB).

Neo-fundamentalists believe that the supreme leader is holy and infallible and the role of people and elections are merely to discover the leader, whose legitimacy comes from God and not the people. In January 2007, Rafsanjani, who won the 2006 election for Assembly of Experts, rejected this idea and emphasized the fact that the leader and the cleric members of the Assembly of Experts may make wrong decisions and the legitimacy of the leader comes from the people not the God.

Beyond these theoretical debates, advocates of the Islamic Administration are slowly replacing those of the Islamic Republic.

Exporting Islamic Revolution and Islamist diplomacy

After the Revolution, the conservative and radical factions differed on foreign policy and cultural issues. The radicals adamantly opposed any rapprochement with the United States and, to a lesser extent, other Western countries, while seeking to expand Iran's relations with the socialist bloc. They advocated active support for Islamic and liberation movements, pushing to "export the revolution" throughout the world. The conservatives favored a more cautious approach, with the aim of normalizing Iran's economic relations with the rest of the world, so long as the West's political and cultural influence on the country could be curbed.

According to Iranian scholar Ehsan Naraghi, anti-Western attitudes among Iranian Islamists had its root in Marxism and Communism rather than Iranian Islam. Iran and the West had good relations with mutual respect after the Safavid era. However, with the emergence of Communism in Iran, anti-Western attitudes proliferated.

After the 1988 end of the Iran–Iraq War and Khomeini's death, pragmatists under Rafsanjani's leadership sought to normalize relations with other countries, particularly those in the region, by playing down the export idea. After Ahmadinejad's victory in the 2005 elections and the defeat of pragmatists/reformists (under Khatami), the Neoconservatives who gained control of both parliament and government resurrected the export idea.

Following the Revolution, the government (with the patronage of Vladimir Putin's Russian Federation), pursued an Islamic foreign policy that included creation of Hezbollah, subsidies to Hamas, opposition to Israel and Zionist leaders, and aid to Iraq's Shiite political parties. Hamas leaders verified in 2008 that since Israel pulled out of the Gaza strip in 2005 they had sent their fighters to Iran to train in field tactics and weapons technology. In an interview in 2007, Hezbollah Deputy Secretary-General Naim Kassem told the Iranian Arabic-language TV station al-Qawthar that all military actions in Lebanon must be approved by the Tehran authorities; in 2008 Iran issued a stamp commemorating a recently killed Hezbollah leader.

Fundamentalism and political realism are diplomatically incompatible. Iran's diplomacy lost numerous opportunities provided by international or regional political developments over the country's focus on fundamental values over national interests. The model of realistic fundamentalism did not work in the diplomatic arena.

Muslim thinkers often express "religious internationalism". Religious modernists in Iran have still some inclinations towards religious internationalism, while the concept of nation-state is not accepted. Such beliefs are mainly rooted in traditional thinking rather than postmodernism. Religious intellectuals such as Ahmad Zeidabadi are against religious internationalism.

Western countries have adopted various strategies with respect to fundamentalists. Their attitudes seem mainly driven by geopolitics and the oil market rather than religious extremism per se. According to Graham Fuller of the RAND Corporation and a former vice-chairman of the National Intelligence Council at CIA, the "United States had no problem with Islam or even Islamic fundamentalism as such. [...] one of the closest American allies in the Middle East, Saudi Arabia, is a fundamentalist state."

Maryam Rajavi, leader of People's Mojahedin Organization of Iran (Mojahedin-e-Khalq),  an Islamist-Marxist group that is listed as a terrorist group by the EU and USA, was invited several times by European Parliament members to address the assembly. In 2004 Alejo Vidal Quadras, European Parliament's first Vice President, met with Rajavi.

Mehdi Noorbaksh, of the Center for International Studies, University of St. Thomas, stated that the perceived threat of Islamic fundamentalism to world peace and security is based on a politically and ideologically motivated misinterpretation of the reformist nature of Islamic revival. He claimed that the portrayal of Iran as a terrorist state strengthened the extremists and weakened democratic reformists groups in Iran. Noorbaksh: "The spread of democracy and the introduction of socio-political reforms in the Middle East, especially in Iran, will undermine US domination over the region."

Seminary-university conflicts

One of the main calls raised during the Iranian Cultural Revolution was the call for seminary-university unity. The original idea was a reconciliation between science and religion. Seminary-university unity was an attempted resolution of the historical conflict between science and religion. After the revolution, as clerics came to rule over the country, the idea of seminary-university unity, gradually turned into submission to clerics and seminary teachers. It lost its logical/scholarly meaning and took on a political and practical dimension. The appointment of Abbasali Amid Zanjani as the only clerical president of University of Tehran on 27 December 2005 can be understood in that context. Tehran University is the symbol of higher education in Iran. Abbasali Amid Zanjani holds no academic degree and was appointed by Mohammad Mehdi Zahedi, the minister of Science, Research, and Technology in Ahmadinejad's cabinet.

University of Revolution, a journal in the 1980s, used to include material by neofundamentalists. They attempted to prove that science is without a homeland, that it is not the case that it recognises no geography, and that it is therefore possible to create "Islamic science".

In 2007 Mesbah-Yazdi called university people the most indecent people. In April 2008, Abdollah Javadi Amoli, Ebrahim Amini, Mesbah-Yazdi and Mohammed Emami-Kashani criticized Iranian Universities, university students and Iranian Higher education system as secular, non-Islamic, indecent and cheap.

Islamist art and literature

Both Iranian principle-ism and neo principle-ism are accompanied by art, cinema and literature.  

Neo-principalist and Iranian journalist, Masoud Dehnamakiwas the managing director and chief editor of the weeklies Shalamcheh and Jebheh. These journals were among the main neo-principalist publications. Dehnamaki was one of the strongest opponents of President Khatami and his policies. Shalamcheh  was closed down by the press supervisory board of the Ministry of Culture and Islamic Guidance, presumably for insulting or criticizing the late Grand Ayatollah Kho'i, who had called the "velayat-e faqih" position unislamic, prior to his passing away. He turned to documentary films. Poverty and Prostitution was released in 2002. His next documentary was Which Blue, Which Red, a film about the rivalry between Teheran's two football teams, Esteqlal and Persepolis.

Perhaps the most influential neo-conservative newspaper during the 1990s and 2000s was Kayhan daily. Hossein Shariatmadari and Hossein Saffar Harandi (who later became Minister of Culture) were the editor and responsible chief of the newspaper. In 2006, British ambassador to Tehran met Hossein Shariatmadari acknowledged the role of Kayhan in the region.

To promote art and literature, Islamic Development Organization was founded by Ayatollah Khomeini. In 1991, Ali Khamenei revised the organization's structure and plans to promote religious and moral ideas through art and literature. According to the Minister of Culture, Hossein Saffar Harandi, the funds for Qur'anic activities would increase fourfold by 2007. "All of the ninth governments' cultural and artistic activities should conform to the Holy Book," he declared.

While promoting conforming art and literature, principalists rejected the development of art and literature that has no "valuable content." In 1996, following a fatwa by Ali Khamenei stating that music education corrupts the minds of young children, many music schools were closed and music instruction to children under the age of 16 was banned by public establishments (although private instruction continued). In 2010, Khamenei said that while music is permissible, it is not compatible with the values of the Islamic Republic, and promoted science and sport as alternatives. Khamenei and his followers claimed that "Nihilism and Beatle-ism" have ravaged Western youth. According to the novelist and the first president of Iranian Association of Writers after the revolution, Simin Daneshvar, the Islamic Republic has been generally hostile toward Iranian writers and intellectuals in contrast to the Pahlavi regime.

In 2007, Javad Shamghadri, artistic advisor to President Ahmadinejad, publicly stated that: "Like many other countries in the world, Iran too can get along without a film industry." He added, "Only 20 percent of people go to the cinema, and their needs can be provided through the national radio and television network."

Islamic-neoclassical economy 
Shortly after the revolution Khomeini declared that Islam and not the economy was important. In one of his comments, he dismissed the concerns of his first prime minister, Mehdi Bazargan, about the economy stating, "Economics is for donkeys!" However on many occasions he advised his followers about justice and giving priority to the rights of the deprived and oppressed.

Association of the Lecturers of Qom's Seminaries (ALQRS or Jame'eh-ye Modarresin-e Howzeh-ye 'Elmiyeh-ye Qom), published their description of an Islamic economy in 1984. It was based on traditional Islamic jurisprudence, which ALQRS reported to be compatible with markets and neoclassical economics. They emphasized economic growth over social equity and declared the quest for profit as legitimate under Islam. According to ALQRS, attaining "maximum welfare" in a neoclassical sense is the aim of an Islamic economic system. However, the system must establish the limits of individual rights. In accordance with this ideological-methodological manifesto of the ALQRS, in February 1984, the council for cultural revolution proposed a national curriculum for economics for all Iranian Universities.

The concept of "Islamic economics" disappeared soon after the revolutionary heat dissipated (the end of the 1980s and after Khomeini's death). It disappeared from Iranian political discourse for fifteen years. In the June 2005 presidential elections, neither Ahmadinejad, nor any of his reformist or conservative opponents mentioned Islamic economy. However, after the establishment of Ahmadinejad's government, his neoconservative team took up the subject. For instance, vice-president Parviz Davoudi said in 2006:
"On the economic field, we are dutybound to implement an Islamic economy and not a capitalistic economy. [...] It is a false image to think that we will make equations and attitudes based on those in a capitalistic system".

Factional conflict dominated Iranian economic politics under Khomeini. The two principal factions were a statist-reformist group that favored state control of the economy and a conservative group that favored the private sector. Both factions claimed Khomeini's support, but by 1987, he had sided with the statist-reformists because he believed state capitalism to be the best way of heading off threats to Islam. Khomeini's death left the factions without their source of legitimacy.

Principalists and women issues

Principalists, irrespective of their gender, promote a strictly limited lifestyle for women. The women in the seventh Iranian parliament were against the proposal to join the Convention on the Elimination of All forms of Discrimination Against Women (CEDAW), for which the female reformists in the sixth parliament had fought. In July 2007, Khamenei criticized Iranian women's rights activists and CEDAW: "In our country ... some activist women, and some men, have been trying to play with Islamic rules in order to match international conventions related to women," Khamenei said. "This is wrong." However he was positive on interpreting Islamic law in a way that it is more favorable for women–but not by adopting Western conventions. Khamenei made these comments two days after women's right activist Delaram Ali was sentenced to 34 months of jail and 10 lashes. The Iranian judiciary operates under the control of the Supreme Leader and is independent from the government.

Principalists pushed traditional garb soon after the revolution of 1979, which had been outlawed by Pahlavi. Since then the police attack women who do not adhere to the tradition. Fighting such women is considered "fighting morally corrupt people" by principalists. In 2007 a national crackdown was launched by the police in which thousands of women were warned and hundreds were arrested. Violators can be whipped, fined and imprisoned. Sae'ed Mortazavi, Tehran's public prosecutor, made this clear when he told the Etemad newspaper: "These women who appear in public like decadent models endanger the security and dignity of young men". Mohammad Taqi Rahbar, a fundamentalist MP, agreed, saying, "Men see models in the streets and ignore their own wives at home. This weakens the pillars of family."

In October 2002, Ali Khamenei called on Iranian women to avoid feminism and sexism in their rights campaigns. "In the process of raising women's issues and solving their problems, feminist inclinations and sexism should be avoided," he told a group of female parliamentarians.

Like many other Grand Ayatollahs, Khamenei believes that women should be wives and mothers. He publicly stated, "The real value of a woman is measured by how much she makes the family environment for her husband and children like a paradise." In July 1997 Khamenei said that the idea of women's equal participation in society was "negative, primitive and childish".

Fundamentalist scholars justify the different religious laws for men and women by referring to their biological and sociological differences. For example, regarding the inheritance law which states that women's share of inheritance is half that of men, Ayatollah Makarim Shirazi quotes Imam Ali ibn Musa Al-reza who reasoned that at the time of marriage man has to pay something to woman and woman receives something, and that men are responsible for both their wives' and their own expenses but women have no such responsibility. Women, however, make up 27% of the Iranian labor force, and the percentage of all Iranian women who are economically active more than doubled from 6.1% in 1986 to 13.7% in 2000.

Life expectancy went up by eleven years between 1980 and 2000 for both men and women. With respect to family planning, "levels of childbearing have declined faster than in any other country," going from 5.6 births per woman in 1985 to 2.0 in 2000, a drop accomplished by a voluntary, but government-sponsored, birth control program. The fact that these changes occurred within an Islamic legal regime suggests that formal legal status may not be a key factor determining women's well-being.

Women are only allowed to sing in chorus, and are not allowed to attend sport stadiums. In 2006 Ahmadinejad surprisingly ordered the vice president to allocate half of the Azadi Soccer Stadium to women. Six Grand Ayatollahs and several MPs protested the move, and finally Khamenei ordered the president to follow the clergy.

Tolerance and civil rights

Tolerance and civil rights are subjects of debates in Iran. Cleric and member of the conservative Islamic Coalition Party, Hojjatoleslam Khorsand, was cited by Etemad Daily as saying that "in cultural issues, a policy of tolerance and laxity is not acceptable." Mesbah-Yazdi, a member of the Assembly of Experts, said about Islam's enemies: "They presented principles such as tolerance and compromise as absolute values while violence was introduced as a non-value." Mesbah-Yazdi stated that "the taboo–that every act of violence is bad and every act of tolerance is good–must be broken." Opponents of violence–"even some of the elite"–have been "deceived and entrapped" by "foreign propaganda," he said. Mesbah-Yazdi believes that "The enemies of Islam must also feel the harshness and violence of Islam." He also stated that "The culture of tolerance and indulgence means the disarming of society of its defense mechanism."

Dividing Iranians into Insider and Outsider was first introduced by Khamenei. Kayhan, which is governed by Khamenei, editorialized on 5 August 1999 that an Insider is "someone whose heart beats for Islam, the revolution and the Imam," while Outsiders are those who have "separated their path from the line of the Imam, the system, and the people who, by relying on citizens' rights, want to introduce themselves as equal partners."

Irreligious people in Iran have less rights then religious people. For example the President of Iran by constitution must be religious. While Jews, Christians and other minorities have the right to take part in University entrance exams and can become members of parliament or city councils, irreligious people are not granted even their rights.

On one occasion, Persian daily Neshat published an article that called for abolishing the death penalty, claiming that capital punishment is no cure for maladies afflicting modern society. In reaction to this article, conservative Tehran Times Daily stressed that writers of such articles must remember that Iran will not only never tolerate such follies but that the apostates will be given no opportunity to subvert the religion. Neshat's article drew criticism from the theologians and clerics, particularly Khamenei, who warned that apostate journalists are subject to the death penalty, noting the article, adding that the judiciary warned against any acts or words that undermine the Islamic revolution.

In 2002, Ansar e Hezbollah, a group best known for disrupting reformist gatherings and beating up students, declared a "holy war" to rid Iran of reformers who promote Western democracy and challenge the Supreme Leader. Masoud Dehnamaki, an ideologue with the group, also said that Iranians who try to appease Iran's enemies such as the United States "should be stopped".

During Khatami's presidency, minister Ataollah Mohajerani launched a tolerance policy ("Tasahol va Tasamoh"). This policy was criticized harshly by conservatives and ended in the minister's resignation.

While conservatives such as Emad Afrough support the idea of civil society, others sucyh as Mesbah-Yazdi are opposed to the idea of civil rights. Afrough stated, "If we do not actively seek cultural change, our national and ethnic cultures get destroyed. We must consciously choose to answer the questions confronting us. Today's question is civil society ... I believe we can easily reconstruct civil society here (in Iran) based on our own values and cultural characteristics. Civil society is a necessity, and the growing complexity of society requires it. Our historical past also supports it. In reality, in Iran, as in elsewhere in the Middle East, the only obstacle to civil society is the state." Mesbah-Yazdi, however, stated: "It doesn't matter what the people think. The people are ignorant sheep."

In the February 2004 Parliament elections, the twelve-member Council of Guardians, half of whom are appointed by the Supreme Leader, disqualified thousands of candidates, including many of the reformist parliament members and all the candidates of the Islamic Iran Participation Front party from running. It did not allow 80 members of the 6th Iranian parliament (including the deputy speaker) to run. Apart from Khamenei, many conservative theorists such as Afrough supported the decision of the council and accused the reformist parliament members of "being liberal, secular and with no Iranian identity". Referring to 7th parliament members, Ali Meshkini said of the list of candidates signed by Imam Mahdi: "...I have a special gratitude for Honorable Baqiyatullah (aj), whom when seven months ago during the Night of Power the Divine angels presented him with the list of the names and addresses of the members of the (new) parliament, His Eminency signed all of them...".

In 2007, Khamenei claimed that "Today, homosexuality is a major problem in the western world. They [Western nations] however ignore it. But the reality is that homosexuality has become a serious challenge, pain and unsolvable problem for the intellectuals in the west." Khamenei, however did not name any individuals.

While Iran was quick to condemn attacks on Shia mosques and Shia holy places all over the world, it has been intolerant toward other religions. For instance in 2006, authorities in the city of Qom arrested more than 1,000 followers of Islam's Sufi tradition. On 14 February 2006 Kayhan quoted senior clerics in Qom as saying that Sufism should be eradicated there, while Reuters news agency reported that in September one hard-line cleric, Grand Ayatollah Hossein Noori Hamedani, called for a clampdown on Sufis in Qom. In 2006, Iranian president Mahmoud Ahmadinejad launched a plan to suppress what he called "indecent religious associations that work under the cover of spirituality and Sufism". Morteza Agha-Tehrani, disciple of Mesbah-Yazdi and moral advisor to President Ahmadinejad was the leader of a raid on Sufi mosques in Qom.

Criticism of Islamist interpretation of Islam 
Islamic scholarship in Iran has a long tradition of debate and critique. This tradition poses a challenge to the constitutional order, as seminary-trained scholars studied basic issues of state legitimacy, in particular the state's right to insist on interpretive closure. For example, Mesbah-Yazdi, son of the late Shaykh Abdolkarim Haeri, the founding member of the Qom Theology School, wrote a book about criticism of velayat-e faqıh. The regime responded with force, convening special clergy courts to silence and imprison scholars, in violation of seminary norms of scholarly debate. These conspicuous acts of discipline seem to have backfired, as each escalating punishment has generated new critics.

In Iran epistemological debates have political implications. Because the Islamic Republic stakes its legitimacy on the scholarly authority of its jurist-ruler, the regime takes such debates quite seriously. Through the Special Clergy Court, the regime has tried to clamp down on relativism, calling it self-defeating. Dissident seminarians have
distanced themselves from relativism, calling themselves legitimate religious authorities. It is unclear how the dissidents reconcile the two seminary norms of open debate and scholarly authority, or what political ramifications might follow from such a reconciliation. The dissidents are creating an unprecedentedly rich documentary record of Islamic critique of the Islamic state.

Future of fundamentalism 
Abdolkarim Soroush, advocate of Islamic pluralism, claimed that fundamentalism will self-destruct as it is afflicted with an internal contradiction, which will shatter it from within. Similar ideas have been put forward by Saeed Hajjarian. Abdolkarim Soroush, Mohsen Kadivar, Saeed Hajjarian and Seyyed Hossein Nasr are notable critics of fundamentalism in Iran. Iranian neofundamentalists became a substantial minority in Qom seminaries. However, they enjoy support from two Grand Marjas, namely Nasser Makarem Shirazi and Hossein Noori Hamedani as well as direct support from Khamenei.

Iran as a victim of Islamic fundamentalism

A handful of Iranians were among the innocent dead in the 11 September 2001 attacks. Behnaz Mozakka was among the victims of 7 July 2005 London bombings.

In 1943, a Saudi religious judge ordered an Iranian pilgrim beheaded for allegedly defiling the Great Mosque with excrement supposedly carried into the mosque in his pilgrim's garment.

In 1987, Saudi Arabia's fundamentalist regime attacked Iranian pilgrims who were peacefully demonstrating Hajj and killed some 275 people. 303 others were seriously injured. For years, Iranian pilgrims had attempted to stage peaceful demonstrations in Mecca. Iran claimed the slaughter was the first major attack by Sunni extremists on Shia Iranians. A few days before the massacre, USS Vincennes shot down Iran Air Flight 655, killing 290 civilians. 

In March 2004 (Ashura), Al-Qaeda killed 40 Iranian pilgrims at Shia holy places in Iraq. Many others were injured in the blasts. Ashura commemorates the killing of the revered Imam Hussein at the battle of Karbala in the seventh century AD. It is the event that gave birth to Shia Islam. Ashura is by far the most significant day in the Iranian religious calendar, commemorated as a slaughter of innocents by traitors and tyrants.

Justifying the attack on Iran, Saddam Hussein accused Iranians of "murdering the second (Umar), third (Uthman), and fourth (Ali) Caliphs of Islam". In March 1988, Hussein killed about 20,000 Iranian soldiers using nerve-gas. According to Iraqi documents, assistance in developing chemical weapons was obtained from firms in many countries, including the United States, West Germany, the United Kingdom, France and China.

Iraq also targeted Iranian civilians with chemical weapons. Many thousands were killed in attacks on populations in villages and towns, as well as front-line hospitals. Many still suffer from the effects. In December 2006, Hussein said he would take responsibility "with honour" for any attacks on Iran using conventional or chemical weapons during the 1980–1988 war.

See also

History of the Islamic Republic of Iran
1988 executions of Iranian prisoners
Chain murders of Iran
Cinema Rex Fire
Iran's Cultural Revolution of 1980-1987
Iran student riots, July 1999
Religious intellectualism in Iran
Religious traditionalism in Iran
Liberalism in Iran
Persianization
Muhammad Kazim Khurasani
Mirza Husayn Tehrani
Abdallah Mazandarani
Mirza Ali Aqa Tabrizi
Mirza Sayyed Mohammad Tabatabai
Seyyed Abdollah Behbahani
Ruhollah Khomeini

Further reading
Written by Principalists:
Mohammad Taghi Mesbah-Yazdi, Philosophical Instructions (English translation by Muhammad Legenhausen & Azim Sarvdalir), Binghamton University & Brigham Young University, 1999, .
Mohammad Taghi Mesbah-Yazdi, Islamic Political Theory (Legislation) Vol. 1 (English translation by Mansoor Limba, Translation Unit, Cultural Affairs Department, The Ahl al-Bayt ('a) World Assembly (ABWA), 2008.
Mohammad Taghi Mesbah-Yazdi,  Islamic Political Theory (Statecraft) Vol. 2 (English translation by Mansoor Limba, Translation Unit, Cultural Affairs Department, The Ahl al-Bayt ('a) World Assembly (ABWA), 2008.
Dr.Ahmad Vaezi, Shia Political Thought, Islamic Centre of England, 2004, .

Written by others:

 Resistance: The Essence of the Islamist Revolution by Alastair Crooke, Pluto Press (17 February 2009) .
 Iran's Tortuous Path Toward Islamic Liberalism, International Journal of Politics, Culture and Society, Vol. 15, No. 2, Winter 2001
 Islam, Fundamentalism, and the Betrayal of Tradition: Essays by Western Muslim Scholars (Perennial Philosophy Series) by Joseph Lumbard and Seyyed Hossein Nasr, World Wisdom (23 October 2003) .
 Traditional Islam in the Modern World by Seyyed Hossein, Nasr Kegan Paul International(1995) .
 Roots of the Islamic Revolution in Iran (Four Lectures) by Hamid Algar, Islamic Publications International, January 2001, .
 Democracy, Justice, Fundamentalism and Religious Intellectualism, by Abdolkarim Soroush (2005)
R. Scott Appleby, eds., Accounting for Fundamentalisms (Chicago: University of Chicago Press, 1994), pp. 403–424.
 Islamic Fundamentalism, Edited by Abdel salam Sidahmed and Anoushiravan Ehteshami. Boulder, CO.
 Overcoming Tradition and Modernity: The Search for Islamic Authenticity, By ROBERT D. LEE. Boulder, CO: Westview Press, 1997. .
 The Just Ruler in Shi'ite Islam: The Comprehensive Authority of the Jurist in Imamite Jurisprudence By Abdulaziz Sachedina, Oxford University Press, 1998. .
 The Shia Revival: How Conflicts within Islam Will Shape the Future, by Vali R. Nasr, W. W. Norton (5 August 2006) 
 Democracy in Iran: History and the Quest for Liberty, by Ali Gheissari and Vali Nasr, Oxford University Press, USA (15 June 2006) 
 The Islamic revival in Central Asia: a potent force or a misconception?, By Ghoncheh Tazmini, Central Asian Survey, Volume 20, Issue 1 March 2001, pages 63–83.

References

Politics of Iran
Iranian neoconservatism
History of the Islamic Republic of Iran
Islam in Iran